Elliot Hilton (born 22 November 1989) is a British former figure skater. He is the 2008 British national champion. He qualified for the free skate at two ISU Championships – 2005 Junior Worlds in Kitchener, Ontario, where he finished 16th, and 2009 Europeans in Helsinki, where he finished 24th. He was coached by Yuri Bureiko.

Programs

Results 
JGP: Junior Grand Prix

References

External links 

 

British male single skaters
1989 births
Living people
Sportspeople from Preston, Lancashire
20th-century British people
21st-century British people